Rhode Island Commodore, is Rhode Island's highest honor, and an honorary title bestowed upon individuals by approval of the Governor of Rhode Island. It is not a military rank, requires no duties, and carries with it no pay or other compensation.  However, the Rhode Island Commodores are organized as a non-profit, non-partisan organization with the purpose "to assist and stimulate economic enterprise within Rhode Island by direct action through education, economic promotion, and hospitality."

Organizational history 
The Rhode Island Commodores was established in 1968 by then governor John H. Chafee.  Commissions as a Rhode Island Commodore have always been given to prominent citizens who are business or civic leaders in Rhode Island upon nomination by a commodore and appointment by the governor.  The Governor of Rhode Island, currently Daniel McKee, serves as commander-in-chief of the Commodores and the organization led by its admiral, currently Colin P. Kane and its board of directors.  It is administered by the quasi-public Rhode Island Economic Development Corporation, and its director, currently Marcel A. Valois, serves as vice admiral and as an ex officio member of the board of directors.  As of 2011, there are about 260 Rhode Island Commodores. Prominent speakers are often featured at meetings of the Commodores, but in 2011 the Rhode Island press criticized the organization for their long-held policy of excluding reporters from their privately held meetings.

Charitable and business development activities 
The Rhode Island Commodores is a 501(c)(6) non-profit organization that is devoted to a number of causes, including promoting economic development in Rhode Island, promoting Rhode Island products, conducting educational activities, promoting tourism and serving as goodwill ambassadors toward visitors to the state and while traveling out of the state.  Activities of the Commodores in support of economic development have included participation in efforts to bring new businesses into the state, the co-sponsorship of a statewide business plan competition, and efforts to bring the America's Cup races back to Newport.

The Rhode Island Commodores were a prime proponent of the 1984 Greenhouse Compact, a proposed state industrial policy developed primarily by Ira Magaziner to transition the state away from traditional manufacturing industries toward an innovative high technology economy.  As proposed, the Greenhouse Compact would provide $250 million of state funds that would be invested to provide low interest loans to businesses to hire new workers, to provide for a fund for new product development by businesses, to provide start-up funds for new businesses, and to provide $50 million in business-related research at Brown University and the University of Rhode Island.  When the measure was submitted to the voters in a special referendum held 12 June 1984, the proposal was defeated 121,079 to 29,998.

Notable commodores 

Below is a partial list of notable Rhode Island Commodores:

 Lincoln Almond
 Donald Carcieri
 John H. Chafee
 Lincoln Chafee
 Trudy Coxe
 Donald J. Farish
 Robert G. Flanders, Jr.
 J. Joseph Garrahy
 Alan G. Hassenfeld
 Frank Licht
 Ronald Machtley
 Maxwell Mays
 Philip W. Noel
 Claiborne Pell
 Michael A. Rice 
 Bruce Sundlun
 Ted Turner

See also 

 Commodore
 Kentucky Colonel
 Nebraska Admiral
 Sagamore of the Wabash
 Order of the Long Leaf Pine

References

External links 
 Rhode Island Commodores website

Honorary titles of the United States
Governor of Rhode Island
American awards
State awards and decorations of the United States